The Sagesigan River is a river in northeastern Kenora District in northwestern Ontario, Canada. It is in the James Bay drainage basin and is a right tributary of the Atikameg River.

The Sagesigan River begins at the confluence of several tributary streams and flows northeast and then north to its mouth at the Atikameg River. The Atikameg River flows via the Kapiskau River to James Bay.

References

Sources

Rivers of Kenora District